The 2013 Beijing Capital International Airport bombing occurred at 6:24 pm on Saturday, July 20, 2013, near the Exit B at the second floor of Terminal 3 in Beijing Capital International Airport in Beijing, China. The blast only injured the bomber Ji Zhongxing himself. No flights were affected, according to airport officials.

Attack
The bomb exploded near the Exit B at the second floor of Terminal 3 in Beijing Capital Airport. Ji was distributing flyers and was then stopped from doing so by the police; after, he detonated the device. Witness exclaimed to have seen a man in wheelchair warning them to step back before the explosion. The man then took the bomb out of a bag with him and set it off, although the police were trying to stop him.

The explosion only injured the bomber himself, who was taken to a hospital soon after, but shocked travelers and sent authorities scrambling. The exit was then closed temporarily. Less than two hours after the explosion, airport officials said operations are back to normal and no flights were affected. At the hospital, doctors amputated his left hand and has since been formally charged.

Investigation
The bomber was later identified as Ji Zhongxing by the police, was born in 1979 and from the city of Heze in Shandong province. Police said Zhongxing is a petitioner, a citizen with a grievance against government officials or police. He exclaimed that he was beaten by the security officers in Dongguan, Guangdong in 2005, breaking his back and paralyzing him from waist down. He began his petition after losing the lawsuits against local government while confined to his home with his father. Officials in Dongguan claimed that he was compensated with 100,000 RMB but has been contradicted by Ji's personal blog. The Department of Public Security of Guangdong has already required the government of Dongguan to investigate the concerning case.

Sentencing
On October 15, 2013, Ji Zhongxing was sentenced to six years in prison. On March 22, 2018, Ji Zhongxing was released from prison.

Notes

Attacks in China in 2013
Terrorist incidents in China in 2013
2013 in China
Improvised explosive device bombings in China
History of Beijing
Terrorist attacks on airports
2010s in Beijing
Crime in Beijing
Building bombings in China
July 2013 events in China